The Djugun (also spelt Jukun, Tjunung) are an Aboriginal Australian people of the Kimberley region of Western Australia.

Writing in 1974, Norman Tindale stated that by his time the Djugun had become almost extinct. However, their descendants live on and intermarry with the Yawuru tribe.

Language
According to the Japanese linguist and authority on the Yawuru language, Hosokawa Kōmei, the Djugun spoke a dialect of Yawuru.

Country
Djugun traditional lands extended over some  along the northern coast of Roebuck Bay, up the coast to Willie Creek. Their lands reached inland roughly 15 miles.

Modern Period
The Jukun people, by reason of their modern historical fusion with the southern Yawuru, formed one of the parties in the Yawuru native title holding group, which had its claim to native title recognized by a Federal Court in 2010 for the area around Broome.

Alternative names
 Tjugun
 Tjukun
 Djukun
 Tjugan
 Djukan
 Jukan
 Tjunung
 Kularrabulu
 Jukannganga

Notes

Citations

References

Aboriginal peoples of Western Australia
Kimberley (Western Australia)